The Princess on Broadway is a 1927 American silent comedy-drama film directed by Dallas M. Fitzgerald and starring Pauline Garon, Dorothy Dwan and Johnnie Walker.

Cast
 Pauline Garon as Mary Ryan 
 Dorothy Dwan as Rose Ryan 
 Johnnie Walker as Leon O'Day 
 Harold Miller as Seymour 
 Ethel Clayton as Mrs. Seymour 
 Neely Edwards as Bill Blevins

References

Bibliography
 Munden, Kenneth White. The American Film Institute Catalog of Motion Pictures Produced in the United States, Part 1. University of California Press, 1997.

External links

1927 films
1927 comedy-drama films
Films directed by Dallas M. Fitzgerald
American silent feature films
Pathé Exchange films
American black-and-white films
Butcher's Film Service films
1920s English-language films
1920s American films
Silent American comedy-drama films